A recursive transition network ("RTN") is a graph theoretical schematic used to represent the rules of a context-free grammar. RTNs have application to programming languages, natural language and lexical analysis. Any sentence that is constructed according to the rules of an RTN is said to be "well-formed". The structural elements of a well-formed sentence may also be well-formed sentences by themselves, or they may be simpler structures. This is why RTNs are described as recursive.

Notes and references

See also
 Syntax diagram
 Computational linguistics
 Context free language
 Finite state machine
 Formal grammar
 Parse tree
 Parsing
 Augmented transition network

Diagrams
Natural language processing